Verdery is a surname. Notable people with the surname include:

Emily Verdery Battey (1826–1912), American journalist 
Katherine Verdery (born 1948), American anthropologist and author

See also
Dr. William C. Verdery House